Conny Jepsen (18 January 1921 - 3 February 1989) was a badminton player from Denmark and Sweden.

He won the Danish Championships in 1939 and 1941 but emigrated to England and then Sweden during the Second World War. He won the All England Open Badminton Championships, considered the unofficial World Badminton Championships, in men's singles in 1947 when representing Sweden.

References
All England champions 1899-2007
Article about Conny Jepsen

Swedish male badminton players
Danish male badminton players
1989 deaths
1921 births